Rajeswari Kalyanam is a 1993 Telugu-language drama film directed by Kranthi Kumar. The film was produced by D. Kishore under the Sri Jayabheri Art Productions banner and presented by Murali Mohan. It stars Akkineni Nageswara Rao, Meena, Vanisri, and Suresh and music composed by M. M. Keeravani. The film won seven Nandi Awards.

Plot
The film begins on an ideal couple Master (Akkineni Nageswara Rao) & Seeta (Vanisri) lives alone on an island in river Godavari. They foster a kid Kisthaiah (Baby Shrestha) and decides to adopt him legally. During that time, Sankaram (Suresh) the father of Kisthaiah returns when the couple forced to narrate the past. A few years ago, there used to live a beautiful & courteous girl Rajeswari (Meena) in the neighboring village, daughter of Zamindar Venkat Naidu (Gummadi) who is crippled. Exploiting it, Rajeswari's vicious shrew step-mother Bhavani (Jayachitra) manipulates by acquiring authority over the property and subjecting Rajeswari to hardships. In that plight, the only cheer-up for Rajeswari is amity with Master & Seeta. Thereafter, Sankaram arrives as a veterinary doctor to the village and falls for Rajeswari. Knowing it, Bhavani's torture on Rajeswari reaches peeks. Learning it, Master moves with the wedding proposal to Venkat Naidu. Here, as a flabbergast, Bhavani reveals the truth that Rajeswari is already married and she is a widow. Actually, in Rajeswari's childhood, Bhavani as a ploy performed her espousal with her drunkard brother (Srikanth) by giving sedation. Being aware of it, furious Venkat Naidu, unfortunately, kills the bridegroom which made him paralyzed and compelled to surrender to his wife. Right now, Master mettle against the village, couples up Rajeswari with Sankaram and starts residing on the island. As time passes, Rajeswari becomes pregnant which inflames Bhavani, plans to knock out them when to punish her Venkat Naidu commits suicide. The incident blows up Bhavani's avenge and intrigues to eliminate Sankaram & Rajeswari. In the attack, Rajeswari dies giving birth to Kisthaiah and Sankaram is badly wounded, lost his memory and believed to be dead. At present, Sankaram decides to leave along with the child to which Seeta refuses as she developed plenty of affection on him but Master convinces her. At last, they handover the child to Sankaram. Finally, the movie ends the elderly couple continuing their life journey.

Cast
Akkineni Nageswara Rao as Master
Meena as Rajeswari
Vanisri as Seeta 
Suresh as Shankar 
 Gummadi as Venkat Rayudu
Jayachitra as Bhavani
Srikanth as Bhavani's brother 
Brahmanandam as Kankara Kanaka Rao
Babu Mohan as Pedda Pentaiah
Pakhija as Gaydala Rajamma
Baby Shrestha as Kishtaiah

Soundtrack

Music composed by M. M. Keeravani. Lyrics were written by Veturi. Music released on AKASH Audio Company.

Awards
Nandi Awards
 Best Feature Film - Silver - D. Kishore (1992)
 Best Actress - Meena
 Best Supporting Actress - Jayachitra
 Best Lyricist - Veturi
 Best Female Playback Singer - K. S. Chitra
 Best Music Director - M. M. Keeravani
 Best Costume Designer - Sai

References

External links

Indian drama films
Films scored by M. M. Keeravani
Films directed by Kranthi Kumar
1993 drama films
1993 films